Siliguri) is a major tier-II city in West Bengal. It forms "Twin Cities" with the neighbouring district capital of Jalpaiguri. The city spans areas of the Darjeeling and Jalpaiguri districts in the Indian state of West Bengal. Known as the "Gateway of Northeast India", Siliguri is popular for three Ts - tea, timber and tourism. It is located on the banks of the Mahananda River and the Teesta River at the foothills of the Himalayas. Siliguri is the third largest urban agglomeration in West Bengal, after Kolkata and Asansol.

Siliguri has great strategic importance in West Bengal. It is located conveniently, connecting four international borders i.e. China, Nepal, Bangladesh and Bhutan. It also connects the North-East with mainland India. Located at the foothills of Eastern Himalayas, Siliguri is a significant trading and transportation hub.

History

Middle Ages history

According to Sailen Debnath, "Siliguri" means a stack of pebbles or stones. Until the 19th century this region was called as "Shilchaguri" when there was dense Dolka forest covering the region. Siliguri was a small agricultural village in the  Kingdom of Sikkim. It was captured by the Kingdom of Nepal in 1788, after which Kirati and Nepali Lepchas came to settle in this region.

At that time a river port on Mahananda, South of Siliguri in Phansidewa had an important role in having trade bond with Malda, Bengal and Bihar. This riverine trade line was thus used by the Bhutanese and Sikkimese to bring goods into their mainland.

Modern history
Siliguri started as a small area i.e. now Saktigarh, southern part of city, on the bank of Mahananda River. Treaty of Sugauli in 1815 signed between Britain-Nepal, changed the prospect of Siliguri. As it became a point of transit with Darjeeling hills and Nepal mainland. 1815 onwards, Siliguri started growing rapidly as a small city due to its strategic convenience of trade. In 1865, the British captured Darjeeling and the entire Dooars region to build tea plantations and export the produce to England. For easy exportation they introduced the Siliguri Town railway station which stands to this day, and introduced the Toy train from the station to Darjeeling in 1880. This helped Siliguri gain sub-divisional town status in 1907.

The "Siliguri Corridor" was formed when Bengal was divided into West Bengal and East Pakistan (later Bangladesh) in 1947, with Sikkim later merging with India in 1975. At this point many immigrants came to settle here for better facilities which led to an increased population. Later in 1950 Siliguri achieved municipal status. Keeping in mind the importance of Siliguri, in 1951, the Assam rail link was established with newly made (1949) Meter gauge Siliguri Junction railway station. After few years in 1961 all these stations were connected with broad gauge New Jalpaiguri Junction railway station which later became the most important railway station in Northeast India.

Due to tremendous growth, Siliguri is now far away from its past outlook, becoming the largest and fastest growing city in eastern India after Guwahati. The growth rate of Siliguri was 57.8% during 1971- 1981, considering this growth, Siliguri came under Integrated Urban Development Project program in 1981. Siliguri touched 46.83% of population growth rate in 1981–1991. A treaty between India and China for trade through Nathu La Pass, has expedited development and prospects of Siliguri as an international transportation and logistics hub. Later in 1994 Siliguri built a Municipal corporation which has been responsible for the civic infrastructure and administration of the city of Siliguri. Siliguri has now achieved the status of becoming the 3rd largest city in West Bengal, after Kolkata.

Geography

Location

This city is spread over an area of 260 km2 within the Siliguri Corridor, also known as the Chicken's neck. The city is surrounded by dense forests towards north and lifeline of Siliguri, Mahananda River flows through the city thereby bisecting it into two-halves. Also Teesta river is not so far from the city. Siliguri has an average elevation of 122 metres (400 feet). As Siliguri is located in the Terai region, the soil is sandy in nature i.e. the ratio of sand and silt is much higher than clay. This region is very prone to earthquake as there are several fault lines nearby.
The Siliguri subdivision is surrounded by Himalayan ranges towards north and towards south by the country Bangladesh, Uttar Dinajpur district of West Bengal and the Indian state of Bihar. On the east lies Jalpaiguri district and Kalimpong district and bounded on the west by the country of Nepal, thus strategically so important.

Climate 

Siliguri falls under the humid subtropical climate (Cwa), when using the Köppen climate classification.  Warm summer, cool winter and a severe monsoon defines Siliguri's climate.

Temperature

The average annual temperature in Siliguri is 23.7 °C. In summer, the temperature varies from a minimum of 18-22 °C to a maximum of 26-32 °C. The temperature of the hottest month, August is 28.5 °C. The temperature in summer sometimes exceeds 35 °C. On the other hand, the winter maximum temperature hovers around 20-24 °C, and the minimum drops 6-9 °C. January is the coldest month with an average temperature of 16.1 °C. The minimum temperature in winter season sometimes drops 5 °C or below. The highest temperature ever recorded in Siliguri is 41.7 °C, was recorded on 15 April 1952, while the lowest was recorded on 8 January 2018, when the mercury plummeted to 1.9 °C.

Rainfall and other conditions

On an average, Siliguri gets 3340 mm per year. Winters are mostly dry, with the summers being rainy. About 80% of the annual rainfall is felt between June to September, this period is known as monsoons or rainy season in the season cycle. Heavy showers are often felt in May, June, July, August and September. July is the wettest month (804 mm) and January is the driest month (12 mm). The average rainy days in July is 27 and for December and January it is 1. The humidity in air is high throughout the year.

Demographics 

Based on Census data of 2011,  the population of Siliguri UA/Metropolitan (including Siliguri municipal corporation and Dabagram municipality) is 701,489, while the population in the Municipal corporation area is 5,13,264. Males constitute 51.44% of the population and females 48.55%. Population shares of Scheduled Caste and Scheduled Tribe category persons in Siliguri municipal area are 8.84% and 1.25% respectively. The literacy rate in Siliguri is 77.64%. There are 154 notified and 31 non-notified slums in Siliguri, with 32% of Siliguri's population staying in them.

Languages

Bengali is the official language in Siliguri subdivision, including Siliguri city.

In the municipal corporation at the time of the 2011 census, 60.88% of the population spoke Bengali, 25.24% Hindi, 4.66% Nepali, 2.39% Bhojpuri, 1.58% Marwari and 1.24% Urdu as their first language.

Bengalis form the majority linguistic group in the city,  followed by Biharis, Marwaris, Punjabis, Nepalis, Odias, and Tribals. According to a 2001 thesis, Bengali speakers had a percentage of 64.25% out of the total population. Of the 30 wards in 2001, their population varied between 11.71% to 98.96%.

Religion
The most commonly followed religion in Siliguri is Hinduism, with Islam being the largest minority religion, followed by small percentage of adherents of Christianity and Buddhism.

Governance and politics

Civic administration 
Siliguri saw rapid urbanisation under the British rule and that was reflected in its local governance as well. The earliest form of local urban governance as a Sanitation Committee set up in 1915.  Its function was to dispose off night soil. Till 1921, most aspects of local governance in Darjeeling district, including Siliguri, was looked after by the Darjeeling Improvement Fund. In 1922,  Siliguri Local Board with nominated members was created under the Bengal Local Self Government Act, 1885. In 1938, the Union Board was set up in Siliguri under the Bengal Village Self-Government Act, 1919 and it provided public utilities in the city.

The Municipal Council was set up in 1949 under the Bengal Municipal Act of 1932 with 8 wards. The first chairperson of the municipality was the Sub Divisional Officer and the local councilors, called 'commissioners' in the then municipal act in effect, were nominated by the state government. After the amendment of the act in 1956, 3/4 of the local representatives were elected, while the remaining nominated by the Deputy Commissioner. Thus, the first elected chairperson of Siliguri was Jagdish Chandra Bhattacharya.

In 1994, the municipal council was upgraded to the Siliguri Municipal Corporation with 47 wards. It had five departments then: General Administration, Collection, License, Public Works and Sanitation and Public Health. The corporation now has 23 departments. It has 47 wards, of which 14 wards are in Jalpaiguri district, while the remaining 33 wards are in Darjeeling district. The last municipal elections was in 2015, when Communist Party of India (Marxist) won 23 seats, All India Trinamool Congress won 17 seats, Indian National Congress won 5 seats, Bharatiya Janata Party won 2 seats, while an independent candidate won 1 seat. The mayor of Siliguri for the 5-year term of 2015-20 was Ashok Bhattacharya from CPIM, who was later elected as the local Member of Legislative Assembly as well.

The term of the last elected body of Siliguri Municipal Corporation got over on 7 May, but municipal elections could not be held because of the COVID-19 pandemic. A Board of Administrators was established with the outgoing mayor, Ashok Bhattacharya, as the chairperson. This board will take care of the civic utilities of the city till the new municipal body is elected. This follows the establishment of similar boards first in state capital Kolkata and then the rest of the state.

Lok Sabha and Vidhan Sabha constituency 
Siliguri is part of the Darjeeling Lok Sabha constituency. The last elections for the Lok Sabha took place in 2019, when Raju Bista from Bharatiya Janta Party won the seat. The last elections to the West Bengal Vidhan Sabha took place in 2021. The Member of Legislative Assembly representing Siliguri Vidhan Sabha Constituency is Sankar Ghosh.

Civic services and infrastructure 

Building plans in Siliguri are approved by Siliguri Municipal corporation; for building up to 3 storeys including parking, the Borough Offices give clearance, while for buildings with more than 3 storeys, the Building Department gives the approval.  The present City Development Plan 2041 for Siliguri was developed in 2015 as part of the Capacity Building for Urban Development project under the then Ministry of Urban Development by the private consultancy, CRISIL Risk and Infrastructure Solutions Limited.  Siliguri City comes under Siliguri Jalpaiguri Planning Area and the responsibility of planning and development of the city lies with Siliguri Jalpaiguri Development Authority.

The Public Health Engineering Department of the state government is responsible for developing and maintaining the infrastructure for water supply, while the Water Supply department of the corporation provides new connections, supplies water, and collects the user charges. The Conservancy Environment Department of the corporation provides Solid Waste Management services in the city. Each ward in the city has its own Solid Waste Management committee that takes care of cleanliness at the ward level. The Public Works Department of the corporation and Siliguri Jalpaiguri Development Authority are both responsible for the construction and maintenance of roads in Siliguri. Siliguri Jalpaiguri Development Authority also prepared the Traffic & Transportation Master Plan 2030 and the Comprehensive Mobility Plan for Siliguri Jalpaiguri Planning Area.

Flora and fauna

Flora 

Siliguri and surrounding Sub-Himalayan forests are rich in fauna diversity, the plains of North Bengal (Siliguri, Jalpaiguri, Cooch Behar etc.) are surrounded by deep forests. These forests are home of various rare and common species of plants. The forest here is moist Tropical and characterised by dense growth of tall Sal i.e. Shorea robusta. Sal occupies about 80% of all vegetation in these tropical forest.

These forests are categorised by their dominating plant species such as 1) East Himalayan Sal Forest present on the lower slopes of Mahananda Wildlife Sanctuary contains Sal, Khair, Simul, Sissoo, Riverine grasslands and various rare species of plants like Orchids 2) East Himalayan Upper Bhabar Sal mainly present at Jalpaiguri district which is characterised by dense population of Microstegium chiliatum, Sal i.e. Shorea robusta. Others are Terminalia tomentosa, Schima wallichii And the 3) Eastern Tarai Sal Forest generally found in lower altitudes compared to other two types of forest. This type of forest characterised by various species of bamboos, ferns, and Sal which is found in Baikunthapur Forest, near Siliguri city.

Rapid growth of city causing deforestation, making Siliguri warmer day by day and unbalancing the ecosystem.

Fauna 

Siliguri is located in the Terai region ("moist land"), a belt of marshy grasslands and dense tropical deciduous moist forests at the base of Himalaya range which is rich in biodiversity, containing numerous rare species of flora and fauna. These forests are characterised by their distinct wildlife variety. Mahananda Wildlife Sanctuary near Siliguri is famous for elephants. Sukna is the gateway to this sanctuary, which is 12 km from Siliguri.

These sub-Himalayan forests are the home of various types of wild animals like the elephant, tiger, Indian bison, barking deer, wild pig, monkey, civet, snake, lizard, mountain goat, sambar, chital and fishing cat. These forests are also home of about 243 different bird species like the pied hornbill, egret, kingfisher, drongo, fly catcher, woodpecker and others. Another common sight is migratory water birds.

Transport

Road
NH 27 crosses through the heart of the city which is now a part of AH2 project. Siliguri originates the century-old Hill Cart Road that is NH 110 which connects Siliguri and Darjeeling (77 km) made in British period. Siliguri also originates NH 10 which connects Gangtok, NH 12 which connects Pankhabari-Mirik. The highways NH 327, that connects Siliguri — Panitanki and NH 327B connecting Panitanki - Mechi Bridg, are also part of AH2.
It connects to adjacent countries through following routes:
 Nepal: via Panitanki
 Bangladesh: via Phulbari
 China: via Nathula, Sikkim
 Bhutan: via Jaigaon

Bus service

 Tenzing Norgay  Bus Terminus: Tenzing Norgay Bus Terminus is the main bus terminus serves as bus depot for both Government and private bus service which operated by NBSTC. It connects to cities in Sikkim, Assam, Bihar, Jharkhand, Meghalaya etc. and all other districts and cities in West Bengal like Darjeeling, Kalimpong, Jalpaiguri, Cooch Behar, Malda, Balurghat, Raiganj, Dalkhola, Berhampore, Kolkata, Asansol, Suri etc.
 Sikkim Nationalised Transport Bus Terminus: Sikkim Nationalised Transport Bus Terminus (Siliguri) is located at hillcart road in siliguri. This bus terminus is operated by Sikkim Government. Mainly buses connecting towns and cities of Sikkim are operated from here. This bus terminus is one of the busy and important bus terminus in siliguri area. Sikkim Nationalised Transport Bus Terminus (Siliguri), which connects Sikkim.
 P. C. Mittal Memorial Bus Terminus:  P.C. Mittal Memorial Bus Terminus is a bus terminal located on Sevoke Road, Siliguri, District Darjeeling. Both state owned North Bengal State Transport Corporation (NBSTC) buses and private buses towards Dooars areas ply from here.

Rail
Being a transportation hub, Siliguri is well connected through railway with almost all parts of the country. There are seven stations that serve the city.
New Jalpaiguri Junction railway station New Jalpaiguri Junction railway station established in 1960 (station code NJP) is an A1 category broad gauge and narrow gauge railway station under Katihar railway division of Northeast Frontier Railway zone. It is the biggest railway station of Northeast India which serves the city Siliguri. This station is well connected to almost all parts of the country except Goa. Also this station ranked 10th cleanest railway station in India in 2016 survey and came among the top 100 booking stations of Indian railway. There are many services available including 1 International Mitali Express, Howrah–New Jalpaiguri Vande Bharat Express, 4 Rajdhani Express, 2 Tourist Vistadome Express, 1 Shatabdi Express and 2 Humsafar Express.

Siliguri Junction Siliguri Junction railway station (station code SGUJ) established in 1949 is another major broad gauge and narrow gauge railway station of Siliguri. Until 2011 it was the only triple gauge (broad gauge, meter gauge and narrow gauge) railway station in India. After 2011 meter gauge was shut down but the track is still present between Siliguri Junction railway station and Bagdogra railway station. There are many services available, towards different cities of India.

Siliguri Town railway station Siliguri Town railway station is one of the oldest railway station (station code SGUT) of the region opened in 1880, 139 years ago for Darjeeling Himalayan Railway (Toy train) which were connecting Siliguri and Darjeeling. It lost its importance due to newly made Siliguri Junction railway station and New Jalpaiguri junction. Siliguri Town railway station is also a broad gauge and narrow gauge railway station which is halting point for 8 trains only.

Bagdogra railway station Bagdogra railway station (station code BORA) comes under greater Siliguri metropolitan area. It is 10 km from Siliguri junction and 3rd largest railway station after NJP and Siliguri Junction. This station serves Bagdogra and adjacent areas. Bagdogra railway station is on Siliguri-Aluabari broad gauge single line via Thakurganj. This station is halting point for 14 trains.

Gulma railway station Gulma railway station Railway (station code GLMA) comes under Siliguri Urban area. It is 12 km from Siliguri City center and serves Champasari anchal, Gulma areas. Gulma railway station is on New Jalpaiguri-Alipurduar-Samuktala Road Line. This station is halting point of 5 trains. Mainly passenger train are halt in this station.

Matigara Railway Station Matigara Railway Station (station code MTRA) is situated at Mathapari, West Bengal. Trains passing through this station include MLFC - SGUJ DEMU and SGUJ- MLFC DEMU. This station has a single platform and two tracks. one broad gauge line and one metre gauge line.

Rangapani railway station Rangapani railway station (station code RNI) comes under greater Siliguri metropolitan area. It is 14 km from Siliguri City center and serves Rangapani and adjacent areas. Rangapani railway station is on Howrah-New Jalpaiguri line. This station is halting point for 2 passenger trains.

Air 

Bagdogra International Airport is an international airport located towards the west of Siliguri city, operated as a civil enclave at AFS Bagdogra of the Indian Air Force. This airport is a major transport hub in the region with flights connecting Kolkata, New Delhi, Mumbai, Chennai, Bangalore, Hyderabad, Ahmedabad, Guwahati, Dibrugarh and has international connectivity with Paro and Bangkok. The airport also has regular helicopter services to Gangtok. Due to its location near Darjeeling hills and Sikkim, Bagdogra international airport sees thousands of tourists annually.
 
Central government of India confirmed international airport status to this airport in 2002 with limited international operations. This is one of the few airports in India with zero sales tax on aviation turbine fuel.

Educational facilities

University
 University of North Bengal, since 1962

Colleges

General degree colleges
Acharya Prafulla Chandra Roy Government College
Siliguri College, Since 1950
Kalipada Ghosh Tarai Mahavidyalaya
Munshi Premchand Mahavidyalaya
North Bengal St. Xavier's College
Gyan Jyoti College
Siliguri College of Commerce
Siliguri Mahila Mahavidyalaya
Surya Sen Mahavidyalaya
Salesian College

 Medical colleges
North Bengal Medical College and Hospital, Since 1968
North Bengal Dental College and Hospital

 Engineering colleges
Siliguri Government Polytechnic College
Siliguri Institute of Technology
Surendra Institute of Engineering & Management

Other Colleges
Inspiria Knowledge Campus

Schools

 English Medium Schools
Delhi Public School (CBSE)
Techno India Group Public School (CBSE)

Army Schools
Army Public School (Bengdubi & Khaprail)
Army Public School, Sukna
Kendriya Vidyalaya Sevoke Road

Media

 Newspaper English newspapers including The Telegraph, Times of India, The Statesman, The Economic Times, and The Asian Age are widely circulated throughout the city. Several Bengali newspapers including Uttarbanga Sambad, Anandabazar Patrika, Bartaman, Uttarer Saradin, Aajkaal, Pratidin, and Ganashakti and Nepali Paper Himalaya Darpan   are available. The leading Hindi dailies Prabhat Khabar and Janpath Samachar are also published from Siliguri.The online based news portals Siliguri Times, Khabar Arohan, Bong Siliguri Times, CCN News, The Siliguri Journal, and Siliguri Barta, Times of North provide live updates regarding Siliguri and adjacent areas.

Radio  All India Radio Siliguri was commissioned in 1963 as an additional station of AIR Kolkata. It has two groups of transmitters, i.e. high power BEL HMB 140 (AM) -2 [2×100 kW] and medium range GCEL 136 (FM) - 2 [2×5 kW], for broadcasting programs. Prantik was the first program broadcast from here in 1969. In the course of time many notable individuals like Hemanta Mukhopadhyay, Ustad Rashid Khan, Subhas Mukhopadhyay, Shashi Kapoor, Manabendra Mukhopadhyay, Madhuri Chattopadhyay, and Priya Ranjan Dasmunshi have visited AIR Siliguri. Popular programs executing from here are Pratyusha, Yuva Anusthan, Grame Ganje, Mahila Majlis, Mananiyeshu, Sishumahal and Arogya. Two radio channels are operated from AIR Siliguri through which programs are broadcasting daily:

In addition to All India Radio, Siliguri has several private FM radio channels:

Television Siliguri receives almost all television channels that are received by rest of the country. Apart from the national terrestrial network Doordarshan, cable TV serves most of the houses. Siliguri also receives some Nepali and Bangladeshi channels too. Siliguri has three local channels: CCN, Amar Cable and HTV. There is a TV tower in Kurseong, about 25 km from Siliguri.

Sports facilities
Siliguri hosts numerous sporting events and matches to influence and build up young athletes from the city.  Some of the important sports enthusiast local clubs in Siliguri organise several cricket, football, volleyball, swimming competition, TT matches etc.  S.A.I or Sports Authority of India in Kanchenjunga Stadium conducts football and athletics. With the provision for an international outdoor and indoor stadium, Siliguri has enough opportunities to host national level matches. This has also led to Siliguri being a prominent city to produce national champions like Mantu Ghosh, the gold medalist winner in the bi-annual South Asian Games (SAF) for table tennis, Ankita Das, Nandita Saha and Soumyajit Ghosh another internationally acclaimed table tennis player and Wriddhiman Saha – Indian international cricketer who plays Test matches for Indian national team. Siliguri has done a tremendous job for Indian table tennis. Bikash Ghosh Memorial Swimming Pool is beside Kanchanjunga stadium in the city, which conducts swimming competitions. White water rafting is done nearby in the Teesta river.

Kanchenjunga stadium
This is the main stadium in Siliguri, a multipurpose stadium, mainly used for football matches, although it has also hosted several cricket matches. It has a capacity of 30,000 people at a time. Recently this stadium is all set to get a facelift.

Football: 
This stadium hosted the Federation Cup 2012 matches of India. The first Federation Cup played on this ground was between Mohun Bagan AC and Churchill Brothers S.C. in 2012.
The final match of the 2013–14 Santosh Trophy was played at the stadium in March 2014.
Seven rounds of the 2015 I-League 2nd Division match were played on this ground.
It also hosted two Kolkata derby matches in 2016 I-league.
All the matches of 2016 SAFF Women's Championship were played in the Kanchenjunga Stadium.
Third I-League derby matches were held in this stadium ground in 2017.

Cricket:
This stadium has hosted 11 Ranji Trophy matches. The first Ranji Trophy played on this ground was between Bengal and Punjab in 2010.
Two Celebrity Cricket League matches were played here. The first Celebrity Cricket League played on this ground was between the Veer Marathi vs Karnataka Bulldozers and Telugu Warriors vs Bengal Tigers in 2013.

Municipal corporation indoor stadium
Indoor sports including table tennis, badminton, taekwon-do, lawn tennis and chess are being played here. Siliguri is renowned for being the training grounds of table tennis players. This stadium can hold 5000 people at a time. The Senior National Table Tennis Championship was recently organised here. Sports festival, 2017 was also held in this indoor stadium.

Visitors' attractions

Darjeeling Himalayan Railway toy train runs between New Jalpaiguri, Siliguri and Darjeeling. It was built between 1879 and 1881 and has been designated as a UNESCO World Heritage Site. Coronation Bridge, also known as Sevoke Bridge, is situated on lower Himalaya about 20 km from Siliguri and was made in 1930 This bridge spans across Teesta River. Gajoldoba view point is 28 km from Siliguri, famous for the huge reservoir formed by Teesta barrage. This reservoir is home for variety of migratory birds (like river lapwing, great crested grebe, Indian cormorant, purple heron, Eurasian wigeon, common shelduck, cotton teal, tufted duck, little ringed plover, great cormorant). Due to shuttling of migratory birds, the Pakhibitan sanctuary was established here. A boating facility is available.

It is fundamentally a part of the Mahananda Wildlife Sanctuary, spread over an area of 700 acres. The park conducts herbivore safaris, carnivore safaris, and elephant safaris. In 1959, it received the status of a sanctuary mainly to protect the Indian bison and royal bengal tiger. This sanctuary is home to rare mountain goat, chital, barking dear, fishing cat, sambar deer, tiger, elephant and Indian bison and migratory birds. It offers mild to medium trekking challenges at some points.

There are some important Hindu and Buddhists monuments in and around the city. Main attraction is the  stupa, which is believed to be founded by the Tibetan Lama, Kalu Rinpoche. The ideal tranquil location for meditation was established by Tibetan monks and followers of Dalai Lama. Sed-Gyued monastery is located near Salugara monastery. It is a breathtaking monument which was destroyed by the Chinese army, and then rebuilt. The monastery is home to more than 90 monks of the Gelukpa division, and is used as a research centre. The ISKCON temple in the city, also known as Sri Sri Radha Madhav Sundar Mandir locally, is one of the biggest Krishna centres in the North-Eastern region of India. The Sevoke Kali temple is an ancient temple on the banks of Teesta river close to the Coronation Bridge.This temple dedicated to Maa Kali, the Goddess of Destruction.

Siliguri also offers amusement and water parks to tourists and locals. Dreamland Amusemet Park, located near Fulbari,  from Siliguri junction, is an agricultural land converted in a fun house. It has 5-6 usual rides with a mini Ropeway also. Savin Kingdom is an amusement and water park which is located near Dagapur in Siliguri. The water park has a pool, slides, artificial wave, and rain dance. It also has various joy rides like adrenaline junkies, sky train, break dance, go-carting, and artificial bulls. A multiplex, kids zone, restaurant are also there.

North Bengal Science Centre, established in 1997, is the only science sentre of North Bengal. The main attractions are Digital Planetarium, Science Shows, 3D Theater, Taramandal Shows, science galleries and a green Science Park. The Hong Kong market is known as the Chandni Chowk of Northeast India, a street market with a variety of shops popping out on the alleyways.

Notable people
 
 
 Ashok Bhattacharya - Ex Minister of Urban Development and Municipal Affairs. 
 Ankita Das - Represented India at the 2012 Summer Olympics in Women's singles event in Table Tennis.
 Goutam Deb - Mayor of Siliguri since February 2022, Ex-Cabinet Minister of Department of Tourism, Government of West Bengal 
 Mantu Ghosh - Indian table tennis player, two time national-level Champion and Arjuna Awardee.
 Richa Ghosh - Indian cricketer, represented 2020 ICC Women's T20 World Cup.
 Soumyajit Ghosh - table tennis player and the youngest Indian to qualify for the London, 2012 Olympics. He also became the youngest national champion at the age of 19.
 Charu Majumdar - founder of the Communist Party of India (Marxist–Leninist).
 Sailendra Nath Roy - Guinness Book of World Record holder for the farthest distance travelled on a zip wire and pulled 40 tonnes DHR toy train using hair.
 Nandita Saha - table tennis player who was part of Indian trio, defeated Canada in Commonwealth 2006 at Melbourne and won bronze medal for India.
 Wriddhiman Saha - cricketer who plays Test matches for Indian national team.

See also
Siliguri Jalpaiguri Development Authority
 Siliguri subdivision
 List of cities in West Bengal
 List of metropolitan area in West Bengal

References

External links 

 Siliguri Municipal Corporation
 Siliguri Jalpaiguri Development Authority

 
Cities and towns in Jalpaiguri district
Cities and towns in Darjeeling district
Cities in West Bengal